Pakistan participated in the 1954 Asian Games held in the city of Manila, Philippines from 1 May 1954 to 9 May 1954. Pakistan ranked 4th with 5 gold medals in this edition of the Asiad. In these games however Pakistan got 4th Position, but an athlete Abdul Khaliq dubbed as "The Fastest Man of Asia".

Medal table

Medallists

References

Nations at the 1954 Asian Games
1954
Asian Games